Nicol Sponberg (1970) is an American Christian music singer. 

Sponberg was formerly a member of her brother's band Selah under the maiden name Nicol Smith. She is best known for her 2004 album Resurrection and the title song "Resurrection". The third single from her solo album Resurrection, "Crazy In Love", crossed over to peak at No. 13 on the Billboard Adult Contemporary chart and was one of the Top 30 most played adult contemporary songs of 2006.

References

1970 births
Living people
American performers of Christian music
21st-century American singers